Ilya Shtilman (2 December 1902 Kiev, 11 August 1966 - Kiev) - Soviet painter and art teacher, professor (from 1947).

The artistic heritage 
Works of Ilya Shtilman are located in various museums such as: the State Tretyakov Gallery (Russia), the National Art Museum of Ukraine, The National Academy of Fine Arts and Architecture of Ukraine, most of the major museums and private collections of Ukraine, USA, Canada, Germany and Israel.  Some of the  most famous works include:
 "Musicians in the Jewish wedding" (1927);
 "Urban Landscape" (1936);
 Series of landscapes "Dnepr dressed in granite" (1936–1937);
 Portrait of the Artist Shovkunenko A. (1939);
 "Outskirts of Samarkand" (1943);
 "Zagorsk Winter" (1943);
 "Winter" (1946);
 "Wind" (1947);
 "Vladimir Hill" (1947);
 Portrait of the artist Kasia B. (1947);
 "Field" (1950);
 "The storm is approaching" (1951);
 "Lilac and lilies of the valley" (1952);
 "A month went up" (1953);
 "Kanevsky Carpathians. Chernecha Mountain "(1963);
 "Apple trees" (1965);
 "Sednevskie given" (1966);
 and others...

Exhibitions 
 Personal exhibitions of Ilya Shtilman have been organized at the National Art Museum of Ukraine in
 1970
 1982 (80th anniversary)
 1992 (90th anniversary)
 2003 (100th anniversary)

References

External links
 О. Смаль. Гармония профессора Штильмана. Зеркало недели, №15, 19.04.2003
 Работы И. Штильмана в собраниях Луганского художественного музея. 
 Киевский календарь
 Семья профессора Штильмана

1902 births
1966 deaths
Artists from Kyiv
20th-century Ukrainian painters
20th-century Ukrainian male artists
Academic staff of the National Academy of Visual Arts and Architecture
Ukrainian male painters